The 2007 North Hertfordshire District Council election was held on 3 May 2007, at the same time as other local elections across England and Scotland. All 49 seats on North Hertfordshire District Council were up for election following changes to ward boundaries. Labour and the Liberal Democrats (UK) both increased their number of seats, but the Conservatives retained their majority on the council. The Conservative leader, F. John Smith, remained leader of the council after the election.

Overall results
The overall results were as follows:

Ward Results
The main changes to the previous ward structure were:
Graveley and Wymondley ward was renamed Chesfield and increased from having one councillor to two.
Letchworth East ward had its number of councillors reduced from three to two.
The three separate single-councillor wards of Offa, Hoo and Hitchwood were combined into a three-councillor ward called Hitchwood, Offa and Hoo.
The results for each ward were as follows. An asterisk(*) indicates a sitting councillor standing for re-election.

References

2007 English local elections
2007